Ficus semicordata, commonly known as the drooping fig, is a small to medium-sized fodder tree of genus Ficus. It bears edible fruit. The figs on the lower part of the leafless branches may develop in leaf litter and humus, and be buried in the surface of the soil, where the seeds germinate. Otherwise birds and other animals distribute the seeds.

Ficus semicordata is dioecious, with male and female flowers produced on separate individuals.

References

semicordata
Flora of the Indian subcontinent
Flora of Indo-China
Dioecious plants